The Bloke from Freeman's Bay is a 1920 New Zealand silent short comedy which was the first film from Rudall Hayward.

Rudall made this two-reel comedy in 1920.
It was shot on location in the suburb of Freemans Bay, Auckland.

Cast
George Forde as The Bloke

Reception
The film was screened in family-owned cinemas attracting a full house on its opening night.
Hayward's uncle Henry was unimpressed with the film and offered Rudall £50 to burn it.
Hayward was prosecuted by the Auckland City Council in the Police Court and fined £1 on each of two charges for putting up posters for The Bloke from Freeman’s Bay in unauthorised places contrary to city by-laws, in October 1921.

References

External links

1920 films
1920s New Zealand films
New Zealand silent films
1920s English-language films
Films set in New Zealand
Films shot in New Zealand